March Story (stylized as MARCH STORY) is a Japanese manga series written by Kim Hyung-min and illustrated by Yang Kyung-il. It was serialized in Shogakukan's Monthly Sunday Gene-X from December 2007 to January 2013.

Publication
Written by Kim Hyung-min and illustrated by Yang Kyung-il, March Story ran in Shogakukan's Monthly Sunday Gene-X from December 19, 2007, to January 19, 2013. Shogakukan collected its chapters in five tankōbon volumes, released from December 19, 2008, to April 19, 2013.

In North America, the series has been licensed by Viz Media. Viz Media released the five volumes between October 19, 2010, and March 18, 2014.

Volume list

Reception

Deb Aoki from About.com wrote: "March Story features some dazzling and delicate, almost art nouveau-style art to go along with its often gruesome fables. This very grim fairy tale series will appeal to fans of Vertigo's Fables or Sandman, which makes it a good pick if you're aching for something new to read on All Hallow's Eve."

References

External links
March Story at Monthly Sunday Gene-X 

Action anime and manga
Dark fantasy anime and manga
Seinen manga
Shogakukan manga
Viz Media manga